Gonzalo Agustín Piermarteri (born 6 May 1995 in Córdoba, Argentina) is an Argentine footballer currently playing for Guillermo Brown.

Teams 
  Instituto de Córdoba 2012–2014
  Rangers 2014
  Catania 2014–2017
  Guillermo Brown 2017–2019
  Cuneo 2019-

References 
 Profile at Calcio Catania.it

1995 births
Living people
Argentine footballers
Argentine expatriate footballers
Instituto footballers
Catania S.S.D. players
Rangers de Talca footballers
Chilean Primera División players
Expatriate footballers in Chile
Expatriate footballers in Italy
Association football midfielders
Footballers from Córdoba, Argentina
Argentine expatriate sportspeople in Chile
Argentine expatriate sportspeople in Italy